El Mundo was "an anti-Popular, conservative broadsheet" Puerto Rican newspaper founded in 1919 by Romualdo Real. Its slogan was "Verdad y Justicia" (Truth and Justice). In 1929, former corrector-turned-administrator Angel Ramos and journalist José Coll Vidal, bought the newspaper when Real retired. In 1946 Ramos was the sole owner of the newspaper.

Acquisitions

El Mundo acquired WKAQ AM, the oldest radio station on the island, and later added WKAQ-TV channel 2. El Mundo also established WKAQ-FM, but it is unknown if the current station at 104.7 MHz was part of the operation in the Ramos days. The paper's radio operations were owned by "El Mundo Broadcasting", and the television station was owned by Telemundo; the Telemundo name would later be used by a mainland group of stations for the namesake Telemundo network now owned by NBC Universal, which also owns WKAQ-TV.

Angel Ramos died in 1960. Upon his death, his wife, Argentina S. Hills, took over the reins of Ramos' enterprise.

Demise
El Mundo closed in 1986, following an extremely contentious mid seventies labor strike. Printing plates were shipped out from the El Mundo building by helicopter. El Mundo returned, headed by Mr. Hector Gonzalez as the new owner, and was managed by its vice president and general manager, Mr. José Iván Aldea, as employee # 001. Later, El Mundo hired Mr. Sergio Camero as president to jointly run the operation. Camero and Aldea ran the operation for some time. El Mundo re-opened on January 6, 1988, and eventually closed a few years later plagued by union difficulties.

Contributors
Hector Campos-Parsi
Magali García Ramis

References

External links

 View the 1928, 1937, 1938, and 1939 issues of El Mundo HERE
 Online exhibit about political landscape of Puerto Rico (1936–1939) as reported in El Mundo *

Spanish-language newspapers published in Puerto Rico
Publications established in 1919
Defunct newspapers published in Puerto Rico
Publications disestablished in 1986
1919 establishments in Puerto Rico